Deh-e Now (also Romanized as Deh Nau and Dehnow) is a village in Qaedrahmat Rural District, Zagheh District, Khorramabad County, Lorestan Province, Iran. At the 2006 census, its population was 119, in 27 families.

References 

Towns and villages in Khorramabad County